At the 2011 Pan Arab Games, the chess events were held at Aspire Zone in Doha, Qatar from 10–22 December. A total of 6 events were contested.

Medal summary

Men

Women

Medal table

References

External links
Chess at official website

Pan Arab Games
Events at the 2011 Pan Arab Games
2011 Pan Arab Games